Cerro Pajonal is a mountain in the Andes Mountains of Argentina.

See also
List of mountains in the Andes

Pajonal, Cerro